The 1989 New Democratic Party leadership election was held in Winnipeg, Manitoba, from November 30 to December 3 to elect a leader of the New Democratic Party of Canada.  Ed Broadbent retired as federal leader, and Audrey McLaughlin was elected as his replacement. McLaughlin's victory was the first time a woman won the leadership of a major federal Canadian political party. This convention was followed by six years of decline for the party, culminating in the worst electoral performance of a 20th-century federal democratic socialist party, when the party received only seven percent of the popular vote in the 1993 federal election.

Prelude

Canadians elected a record 43 NDP Members of Parliament (MPs) in the election of 1988. The Liberal Party, however, had reaped most of the benefits of opposing free trade to emerge as the dominant alternative to the Progressive Conservative (PC) government. The PCs' barrage of attacks on the Liberals, and vote-splitting between the NDP and Liberals, helped them win a second consecutive majority.  In 1989, Broadbent stepped down after 14 years as federal leader of the NDP.

Leadership vote
At the 1989 Winnipeg leadership convention, former B.C. Premier Dave Barrett and Audrey McLaughlin were the main contenders for the leadership. During the campaign, Barrett argued that the party should be concerned with western alienation, rather than focusing its attention on Quebec. The Quebec wing of the NDP strongly opposed Barrett's candidacy, with Phil Edmonston, the party's main spokesman in Quebec, threatening to resign from the party if Barrett won.

McLaughlin won the leadership on the fourth ballot, with 1316 votes for 55 percent of the vote, versus Barrett's 1072 votes (45 percent). Her victory  meant that she became first woman in Canada to lead a major, recognized, federal political party.

Aftermath
The party enjoyed strong support among organized labour and rural voters in the Prairies. McLaughlin tried to expand its support into Quebec without much success. In 1989, the Quebec New Democratic Party adopted a sovereigntist platform and severed its ties with the federal NDP. Under McLaughlin, the party won an election in Quebec for the first time when Edmonston won a 1990 by-election.  The party had briefly picked up its first Quebec MP in 1986, when Robert Toupin crossed the floor from the Tories after briefly sitting as an independent.  However, he left the party in October 1987 after claiming communists had infiltrated the party.

New Democrats who declined to run.
1.Nelson Riis, British Columbia M.P
2.Jim Fulton, British Columbia M.P
3.Pauline Jewett, former British Columbia M.P
4.Ross Harvey, Alberta M.P
5.Allan Blakeney, former Saskatchewan Premier
6.Lorne Nystrom, Saskatchewan M.P
7.Howard Pawley, former Manitoba Premier
8.Stephen Lewis, former Ontario N.D.P Leader
9.Michael Cassidy, former M.P, former Ontario N.D.P leader
10.Bob Rae, Ontario N.D.P Leader, former M.P
11.Lynn McDonald, Former Ontario M.P
12.Marion Dewar, Former Ontario M.P, former Ottawa Mayor
13.John Rodriguez, Ontario M.P
14.Bob White, President Canadian Auto Workers
15.Ian Deans, former Ontario M.P
16.Remy Trudel, 1988 Quebec N.D.P candidate
17.Phil Edmonston, soon to be Quebec M.P, consumer advocate
18.Nancy Riche, Union Leader
19.Alexa McDonough, Nova Scotia N.D.P leader
20.Jack Harris, Former Newfoundland M.P 
21.Tony Penikett, Yukon Government Leader

Notes

References
 
 

New Democratic Party
1989
New Democratic Party leadership election